Herbstia is a monotypic genus of flowering plants belonging to the family Amaranthaceae. It only contains one species, Herbstia brasiliana (Moq.) Sohmer  It is within the Amaranthoideae subfamily.

Description
A sub-shrub, which has bisexual flowers (bearing both male and female reproductive organs), disposed in 1 or several cymules (a small cyme) clustered in the leaf axils with the ovate.

Range and habitat
It is native to Brazil, Paraguay and north-eastern Argentina.
It grows in the Atlantic Rainforest.

Taxonomy
In 1976, botanist Seymour Hans Sohmer (from the University of Wisconsin), was carrying out a study of plants within the genus of Chamissoa (in the family Amaranthaceae of the Caryophyllales order), he found out that Chamissoa brasiliana 
was different to other Chamissoa plants in many ways including; habit, morphology, nature of the seed and fruit. So Sohmer published the plant as 
Herbstia brasiliana.

The genus name of Herbstia is in honour of Dr. Derral Raymon Herbst (b. 1934), an American botanist in Hawaii. The Latin specific epithet of brasiliana refers to Brazil, where the plant was originally found.
Herbstia brasiliana was first described and published in Brittonia Vol.28 on page 450 (in 1976, publ. 1977). The plant was originally called Banalia brasiliana , which was first described and published in A.P.de Candolle, Prodr. Vol.13 Issue 2, on page 278 in 1849.

References

Amaranthaceae
Plants described in 1849
Flora of Brazil
Flora of Argentina
Flora of Paraguay